The 2002 Mid-Eastern Athletic Conference men's basketball tournament took place March 4–9, 2002, at the Arthur Ashe Athletic Center in Richmond, Virginia.  defeated , 80–62 in the championship game, to win its second consecutive MEAC Tournament title. The Pirates earned an automatic bid to the 2002 NCAA tournament as No. 15 seed in the East region. In the round of 64, Hampton fell to No. 2 seed Connecticut 78–67.

Format
All eleven conference members participated, with the top 5 teams receiving a bye to the quarterfinal round. After seeds 6 through 11 completed games in the first round, teams were re-seeded. The lowest remaining seed was slotted against the top seed, next lowest remaining faced the #2 seed, and third lowest remaining seed squared off against the #3 seed.

Bracket

References

MEAC men's basketball tournament
2001–02 Mid-Eastern Athletic Conference men's basketball season
MEAC men's basketball tournament
Basketball competitions in Richmond, Virginia
College basketball tournaments in Virginia